Drew Richard Fata (born July 28, 1983) is a Canadian former professional hockey defenceman. He is the younger brother of Rico Fata, who has played for several NHL teams over the course of his career.

Playing career
As a youth, Fata played in the 1997 Quebec International Pee-Wee Hockey Tournament with a minor ice hockey team from Sault Ste. Marie, Ontario.

Fata was drafted 86th overall in the 2001 NHL Entry Draft by the Pittsburgh Penguins. Without playing a game for the Penguins, Fata signed as a free agent with the New York Islanders on February 4, 2007. When Islanders defenceman Sean Hill received a 20-game suspension on April 20, 2007 after testing positive performance-enhancing drugs, Drew Fata was called upon to take his place in the lineup.  He then made his playoff debut against the Buffalo Sabres on April 20, though the Islanders lost the game and were eliminated from the postseason.

On July 2, 2008, Fata signed with the Phoenix Coyotes. Fata started the 2008–09 season with the Coyotes affiliate, San Antonio Rampage, before he was traded by the Coyotes to the Ottawa Senators for Alexander Nikulin on November 3, 2008.

On July 7, 2009, Fata signed a one-year, two-way deal with the Boston Bruins.

After coming off a season that involved ankle surgery, Fata did not receive any offers for four months. Eventually Fata was invited to return to the Wilkes-Barre/Scranton Penguins, the team where he started his professional career. After one game with the Penguins, Fata was released from his professional tryout contract on November 1, 2010.

On November 1, 2010 Fata signed with Sparta Sarpsborg of the Norwegian GET-ligaen

After a further three seasons abroad with HC Asiago and the Sheffield Steelers, Fata returned to North America to sign a one-year free agent contract with the Arizona Sundogs of the CHL on August 5, 2014. Upon the merge of the CHL into the ECHL, Fata opted to retire from professional hockey and accepted a General Manager role with the Batchewana Attack in the Canadian International Hockey League.

Career statistics

References

External links
 
 

1983 births
Asiago Hockey 1935 players
Binghamton Senators players
Bridgeport Sound Tigers players
Canadian ice hockey defencemen
Sportspeople from Sault Ste. Marie, Ontario
Kingston Frontenacs players
Living people
Canadian people of Italian descent
New York Islanders players
Pittsburgh Penguins draft picks
Providence Bruins players
San Antonio Rampage players
Sheffield Steelers players
Sparta Warriors players
St. Michael's Buzzers players
Toronto St. Michael's Majors players
Wheeling Nailers players
Wilkes-Barre/Scranton Penguins players
Ice hockey people from Ontario
Canadian expatriate ice hockey players in England
Canadian expatriate ice hockey players in Norway
Canadian expatriate ice hockey players in Italy